Domingos Soares Ferreira Penna (June 6, 1818 – January 6, 1888) was a Brazilian naturalist from the state of Minas Gerais, who founded the Museu Paraense Emílio Goeldi, in Belém, and undertook important research in the archeology and natural resources of the lower Amazon River valley.

In 1870, he discovered one of the most important units of Cenozoic fossils in Brazil: Pirabas.
 
He also made important archaeological discoveries that 20th century archaeologists confirmed.  In three letters published by the National Museum (1876a, 1876b, 1877), recorded his observations on the shell mounds installed in the "dark and swampy" regions on the east coast of Para, which he excavated, measured, and mapped, making notes on their condition, conservation, and archeological conditions - human bones, lithic and ceramic artefacts - describing them and locating them in their stratigraphic layers. He correctly identified the coastal and riverine shellmounds of Para as villages inhabited by early fishing people, an insight that scientific archaeologists confirmed in the 1990s.  Always sharing his knowledge with other scholars, he urged geologist Charles Hartt to study the shellmound of Taperinha.  About 100 years later, Taperinha and several other fluvial shellmounds with pottery in the Lower Amazon were shown through radiocarbon dating and luminescence dating to be early Holocene in age, c. 9.000 to 7,000 BP calibrated, making them the earliest pottery sites yet known in the Americas and among the earliest in the world.

The Ferreira Penna Scientific Station in Melgaço, Pará state, Brazil, is named after him, as are various Amazon River boats.

References 

 Cunha, O. R. da (1989). Domingos Soares Ferreira Penna (1818–1888). In: O. R. da Cunha (Auth.), Talento e atitude. Estudos biográficos do Museu Emílio Goeldi (pp. 20–47). Belém, Brazil: Museu Paraense Emílio Goeldi.
 Ferreira Penna, D. S. (1876a). A ilha de Marajó. Relatório apresentado ao Exmo. Sr. Dr. Francisco Maria Corrêa da Sá e Benevides. Belém: Tipographia do Diário Grão-Pará.
Ferreira Penna, D.S. (1876b).  Breve noticia sobre os sambaquis do Para. "Archivos do Museu Nacional do Rio de Janeiro, 1", 85-99. 
 Ferreira Penna, D. S. (1877). Apontamentos sobre os cerâmios do Pará. Archivos do Museu Nacional do Rio de Janeiro, 2, 47-67.
 Ferreira Penna, D. S. (1885). Índios de Marajó. Archivos do Museu Nacional do Rio de Janeiro, 6, 108-115.
 Ferreira Penna, D. S. (1971). Obras completas de Domingos Soares Ferreira Penna (reprint). Belém: Conselho Estadual de Cultura.
 Roosevelt, A. C. (1995). (1995.)  Early pottery in the Amazon, in: Hoopes, J., Barnett, W. (Eds.), The Emergence of Pottery:  Technology and Innovation in Ancient Societies. 	Smithsonian Institution Press, Washington, D. C., 115-131.

Brazilian scientists
History of Amazonia
1888 deaths
1818 births